Başyayla is a town and district of Karaman Province in the Central Anatolia region of Turkey. According to 2000 census, population of the district is 8,155 of which 5,514 live in the town of Başyayla.

Notes

References

External links
 District governor's official website 
 District municipality's official website 

Populated places in Karaman Province
Districts of Karaman Province